Pararrhaptica perkinsiana is a moth of the family Tortricidae. It was first described by Lord Walsingham in 1907. It is endemic to the Hawaiian islands of Molokai and Maui. It is the type species of the genus Pararrhaptica.

External links

Archipini
Endemic moths of Hawaii
Biota of Molokai
Biota of Maui